En mand af betydning is a 1941 Danish family film directed by Emanuel Gregers and starring Osvald Helmuth.

Cast
Osvald Helmuth as Baldur Justesen
Sigrid Horne-Rasmussen as Fru Sonja Jensen
Inger Stender as Anita Justesen
Jens Asby as Bankassistent Georg Brink
Poul Reichhardt as Brødkusk Poul Elvang
Helge Kjærulff-Schmidt as Vicevært Christensen
Tove Bang as Fru Olga Christensen
Aage Fønss as Overassistent Bækgaard
Peter Nielsen as Tømrermester Skjoldager
Carl Viggo Meincke as Maler Nielsen
Charles Wilken as Skrædder Hassmann
Sigurd Langberg as Kriminalbetjent Hjemfeldt
Kaj Mervild as Kriminalbetjent Brede-Hansen
Gerda Madsen as Fru Mortensen
Ulrik Neumann as Henry
Asta Hansen as Sofie
Petrine Sonne as Fru Lewald
Alex Suhr as Kriminalassistent Husum

External links

1941 films
1940s Danish-language films
Danish black-and-white films
Films directed by Emanuel Gregers
1941 drama films
1940s fantasy drama films
Danish fantasy drama films